Bernard Bosson (25 February 1948 – 16 May 2017) was a French politician and lawyer. He served as Minister of Transport, Minister of Tourism, and Minister of Public Works under Prime Minister Édouard Balladur from 1993 to 1995. He was a member of the 12th French National Assembly, representing Haute-Savoie as a member of the Union for French Democracy. He was also the mayor of Annecy. Bosson died in hospital in Lyon, France on 16 May 2017.

Early life 
Bosson was born in Annecy, France to Charles Bosson, former Mayor of Annecy, centrist deputy and senator.

He has degrees in labor law and public law.

References

External links
Official website

1948 births
2017 deaths
People from Annecy
Transport ministers of France
Deputies of the 12th National Assembly of the French Fifth Republic
Mayors of places in Auvergne-Rhône-Alpes
20th-century French lawyers